Oldstead is a village and a civil parish in Ryedale district, North Yorkshire, England, within the North York Moors National Park, off the A170 road between Thirsk and Helmsley, below the Hambleton Hills. Nearby villages include Wass, Kilburn and Coxwold. Oldstead shares a parish council with Byland with Wass.

Amenities 
Oldstead has one pub called the Black Swan, which was awarded a Michelin star for the first time in the 2012 guide. It is currently the only restaurant in Yorkshire and the North East to hold the highly sought-after combination of four AA rosettes and a Michelin Star. Head chef Tommy Banks was the youngest Michelin-starred chef in 2013 and made his TV debut on BBC Two's Great British Menu in 2016.

Features 
Oldstead has a moor called Oldstead Moor, a place of worship and an area called Scotch Corner (not to be confused with Scotch Corner Middleton Tyas) is published on the Ordnance Survey map (though a better description is Scots Corner), reputed to be near the battle of Byland in 1322. At the corner are two buildings originally renovated from dilapidated barns during 1956/7 by John Bunting, Sculptor who dedicated the larger of the two buildings as a non-denominational war memorial chapel and decorated it with several of his sculptures and stained glass windows. The chapel is opened to the public three times each year.

East of the village there is Mount Snever, a hill upon which stands a tower, known as Mount Snever Observatory and built in 1838 to commemorate Queen Victoria's coronation.

References

External links

Villages in North Yorkshire
Civil parishes in North Yorkshire
Ryedale